Hallbergmoos is a municipality in the district of Freising in Bavaria in Germany. The Isar River flows west of the town.

Economy
Augsburg Airways, a regional airline, was headquartered in Hallbergmoos until it ceased to exist. The headquarters of the Eurofighter GmbH, which co-ordinates the design, production and upgrade of the Eurofighter Typhoon, is located here.

When it existed, DBA (Deutsche BA) had its head office on the grounds of Munich International Airport and in Hallbergmoos.

Education
Hallbergmoos has a Grund- und Hauptschule, a combined general primary and secondary general school. The Volkshochschule Hallbergmoos provides adult education services.

The Hallbergmoos Library was established in 1985.

Recreation
The Jugendzentrum Hallbergmoos provides recreational services for youth.

References

External links

 Municipality of Hallbergmoos 
 Municipality of Hallbergmoos 

Freising (district)